{{safesubst:#invoke:RfD|||month = March
|day = 19
|year = 2023
|time = 02:43
|timestamp = 20230319024349

|content=
REDIRECT Ceres (dwarf planet)

}}

Siresh is both a given name and a surname. Notable people with the name include:

Allu Sirish (born 1987), Indian actor
Sirish Gurung (born 1998), Nepalese swimmer